Thalassodes is a genus of moths in the family Geometridae first described by Achille Guenée in 1857.

Description
Palpi with second joint clothed with hair and reaching the apex of the short frontal tuft. Third joint naked and porrect (extending forward). Antennae of male usually bipectinate (comb like on both sides) to two-thirds length. Hind tibia usually dilated with a fold containing a tuft of long hair. Forewings with veins 6, 7, 8, 9 and 10 stalked or vein 6 from cell. Hindwings with angled or produced outer margin to a point at vein 4.

Species

References

Hongxiang Han & Dayong Xue (2011). "Thalassodes and related taxa of emerald moths in China (Geometridae, Geometrinae)". Zootaxa. 3019:26-50.

Hemitheini
Geometridae genera
Taxa named by Achille Guenée